The enzyme o-pyrocatechuate decarboxylase catalyzes the chemical reaction

2,3-dihydroxybenzoate  catechol + CO2

This enzyme belongs to the family of lyases, specifically the carboxy-lyases, which cleave carbon-carbon bonds.  The systematic name of this enzyme class is 2,3-dihydroxybenzoate carboxy-lyase (catechol-forming). This enzyme is also called 2,3-dihydroxybenzoate carboxy-lyase.  This enzyme participates in benzoate degradation via hydroxylation and carbazole degradation.

References

 

EC 4.1.1
Enzymes of unknown structure